Komaratchi block is a revenue block of Cuddalore district of the Indian state of Tamil Nadu. This revenue block consist of 57 panchayat villages.

List of Panchayat Villages 
They  are,

References 

Revenue blocks of Cuddalore district